Love on the Spot is a 1932 British musical film directed by Graham Cutts and starring Rosemary Ames, Richard Dolman and Aubrey Mather.

Plot
Two criminals are reformed when they meet and fall in love.

Cast
 Rosemary Ames as Joan Prior 
 Richard Dolman as Bill Maitland 
 Aubrey Mather as Mr. Prior 
 Helen Ferrers as Lady Witchell 
 W. Cronin Wilson as Inspector MacAndrews 
 Patrick Ludlow as Mr. Terrington 
 Hubert Leslie as Manager 
 Margery Binner as Maid 
 John Singer as Pageboy 
 Patrick Susands as Cartwright

References

Bibliography
 Low, Rachael. Filmmaking in 1930s Britain. George Allen & Unwin, 1985.
 Perry, George. Forever Ealing. Pavilion Books, 1994.

External links

1932 films
British black-and-white films
British musical films
1932 musical films
Films directed by Graham Cutts
Associated Talking Pictures
Films with screenplays by John Paddy Carstairs
1930s English-language films
1930s British films